William Mason (September 10, 1786 – January 13, 1860) was an American physician and politician who served one term as a United States representative from New York from 1835 to 1837.

Biography 
Mason was born in Lebanon, Connecticut on September 10, 1786. He studied medicine in Vermont and practiced in Preston, New York. He was a surgeon of the Chenango County Company, New York Volunteers, in 1812. He then became clerk of Chenango County in 1820 – 1821, and a member of the New York State Assembly in 1821 and 1822.

Congress 
He was elected as a Jacksonian to the 24th United States Congress (March 4, 1835 – March 3, 1837).

Death 
Mason died in Norwich, New York on January 13, 1860; interment in Mount Hope Cemetery.

External links
 

1786 births
1860 deaths
Members of the New York State Assembly
Jacksonian members of the United States House of Representatives from New York (state)
19th-century American politicians

Members of the United States House of Representatives from New York (state)